LGBT rights opposition indicates the opposition to legal rights, proposed or enacted, for lesbian, gay, bisexual, and transgender (LGBT) people. Laws that LGBT rights opponents may be opposed to include civil unions or partnerships, LGBT parenting and adoption, military service, access to assisted reproductive technology, and access to sex reassignment surgery and hormone replacement therapy for transgender individuals.

Organizations influential in LGBT rights opposition frequently oppose the enactment of laws making same-sex marriage legal, the passage of anti-discrimination laws aimed at curtailing anti-LGBT discrimination, including in employment and housing, the passage of anti-bullying laws to protect LGBT minors, laws decriminalizing same-gender relationships, and other LGBT rights-related laws. These groups are often religious or socially conservative in nature. Such opposition can be motivated by homophobia, transphobia, bigotry, animosity, religion, moral beliefs, political ideologies, or other reasons.

According to the Stanford Encyclopedia of Philosophy, "natural law theory offers the most common intellectual defense for differential treatment of gays and lesbians". Dag Øistein Endsjø, Norwegian scholar and professor of Religious studies, and the United Nations Special Rapporteur on Freedom of Religion or Belief have stated that religious belief underlies most forms of LGBT rights opposition.

History 

The first organized gay rights movement arose in the late nineteenth century in Germany.

In the 1920s and into the early 1930s, there were LGBT communities in cities like Berlin; German-Jewish sexologist Magnus Hirschfeld was one of the most notable spokespeople for LGBT rights at this time. When the Nazi party came to power in 1933, one of the party's first acts was to burn down Hirschfeld's Institut für Sexualwissenschaft, where many prominent Nazis had been treated for perceived sexual problems. Initially tolerant to the homosexuality of Ernst Röhm and his followers, many gay men were purged from the Nazi Party following the Night of the Long Knives and the Section 175 Laws began to be enforced again, with gay men interned in concentration camps by 1938.

Under the Nazi rule in Germany, the dismantling of rights for LGBT individuals was approached in two ways. By strengthening and re-enforcing existing laws that had fallen into disuse, male homosexuality was effectively re-criminalised; homosexuality was treated as a medical disorder, but at a social level rather than individual level intended to reduce the incidence of homosexuality. The treatment was a program of eugenics, starting with sterilisation, then a system of working people to death in forced labour camps, and eventually refined by medical scientists to include euthanasia. The driving force was the elimination of perceived degeneracy at various levels – genetic, social, identity and practice, and the elimination of such genetic material in society. Lifton wrote about this in his book The Nazi Doctors:

[...] sexology and defense of homosexuality [...] were aspects of "sexual degeneration, a breakdown of the family and loss of all that is decent," and ultimately the destruction of the German Volk. [...] medicine was to join in the great national healing mission, and the advance image of what Nazi doctors were actually to become: the healer turned killer. [...] Sterilization policies were always associated with the therapeutic and regenerative principles of the biomedical vision: with the "purification of the national body" and the "eradication of morbid hereditary dispositions." Sterilization was considered part of "negative eugenics" [...]

It is argued that the number of gay people who perished in the Holocaust was quite low in comparison to other Holocaust victims, and confined to Germany itself, based on estimates that of 50,000 gay people who came before the courts, between 5,000 and 15,000 ended up in concentration camps. However, many of those who came before the courts were directed (or volunteered) to undergo sterilisation/castration; they would be included with others who, in line with the historic shift in German society (that started with Westphal, and developed through Krafft-Ebing to Magnus Hirschfeld, of homosexuality being seen as having a neurological, endocrinological or genetic basis), were treated for homosexuality as a medical rather than criminal matter. Those treated by psychiatrists and thereby included in the T4 project to eliminate people with alleged medical disorders would not be reflected in the rates of those dealt with as criminals.

After the Second World War, the United States became more intolerant of homosexuality, but many gay men and lesbians decided to reveal their gay identities after meeting others in the military. Many gay bars and villages were created, and a whole gay subculture formed. Campaigns for gay rights began to develop, initially in the UK. Towards the end of the 1960s homosexuality began to be decriminalised and de-medicalised in areas such as the UK, New Zealand, Australia, North America and Europe, in the context of the sexual revolution and anti-psychiatry movements. Organized opposition to gay and lesbian rights began in the 1970s.

Public opinion

Societal attitudes towards homosexuality vary greatly in different cultures and different historical periods, as do attitudes toward sexual desire, activity and relationships in general. All cultures have their own norms regarding appropriate and inappropriate sexuality; some sanction same-sex love and sexuality, while others disapprove of such activities.

According to The 2007 Pew Global Attitudes Project, "Throughout Western Europe and much of the Americas, there is widespread tolerance towards homosexuality. However, the United States, Japan, South Korea, and Israel stand apart from other wealthy nations on this issue; in each of these countries, fewer than half of those surveyed say homosexuality should be accepted by society. Meanwhile, in most of Africa, Asia and the Middle East, there is less tolerance toward homosexuality."

However, a 2012 CNN poll showed that a majority number of Americans are in favor of gay rights, such as same-sex marriage. In late 2015, a poll of Japanese people also found that a majority supported same-sex marriage.

Religious reasons for opposition

Many religions, including ones within the Eastern faiths and Abrahamic faiths, do not support homosexual sex. Evangelical Christianity, Catholicism, Mormonism, Orthodox Judaism, and Islam view homosexual sex as a sin and hold that its practice and acceptance in society weakens moral standards.

Christian opposition 

Passages in the Old Testament that prohibit man to "lie with mankind as with womankind" and the story of Sodom and Gomorrah have historically been interpreted as condemning sodomy. Several Pauline passages have also been cited against male and female homosexuality. Christians who take a conservative position on homosexuality endorse this reading of these passages in the belief that God is against same-sex sexual activity, while Christians who take a liberal position believe that these same passages refer to more specific situations, such as rape or abuse, and not homosexuality. The largest Christian body, the Catholic Church, condemns homosexual acts as "gravely sinful" and "intrinsically disordered". The second-largest Christian body, the Eastern Orthodox Church, also condemns homosexual behaviour, as do most denominations of Protestantism.

Within the Catholic Church, the theory of natural law has been employed by philosophers and theologians to justify its condemnation of homosexual behaviour. The theologian Thomas Aquinas maintained that homosexual practice was contrary to natural law, arguing that the primary natural end of the sexual act was procreation, and since said procreation is carried out from a process of sexual fertilization between a man and a woman, homosexual sex is contrary to the very end of said act.

Islamic opposition 

Sodomy is regarded as criminal and forbidden in most Islamic countries, according to Sharia law, and officially carries the death penalty in Saudi Arabia, United Arab Emirates, Iran, Brunei, Mauritania, Nigeria, and Yemen.

It formerly carried the death penalty in Afghanistan under the Taliban. In Egypt, openly gay men have been prosecuted under general public morality laws. On the other hand, homosexuality has been legal in Turkey since 1858.

In Saudi Arabia, the maximum punishment for homosexuality is public execution, but the government will use other punishments – e.g., fines, jail time, and flagellation – as alternatives, unless it feels that LGBT individuals are challenging state authority by engaging in LGBT social movements. Iran is perhaps the nation to execute the largest number of its citizens for homosexuality. Since the 1979 Islamic revolution in Iran, the Iranian government has executed more than 4,000 people charged with homosexual acts. Even though homosexuality is widespread amongst the Pashtun ethnic group in southern Afghanistan, after the fall of the Taliban, homosexuality went from a capital crime to one that is punished with fines, prison sentences, and vigilante violence.

Most international human rights organizations, such as Human Rights Watch and Amnesty International, condemn laws that make homosexual relations between consenting adults a crime. Muslim nations insist that such laws are necessary to preserve Islamic morality and virtue. Of the nations with a majority of Muslim inhabitants where homosexuality is criminalized, only Lebanon and Tunisia have organizations which are trying to get homosexuality legalized.

Indian and East Asian religious opposition 

Among the religions that originated in India, including Hinduism, Buddhism, Jainism and Sikhism, teachings regarding homosexuality are less clear than among the Abrahamic traditions. Unlike the Abrahamic religions, homosexuality is not a 'sin' in Hindu philosophy, while in Buddhism, the Dalai Lama has stated that male-female relationships are intended by nature, though without condemning same-sex relationships. Gender-specific Temples like Aravan worship are dedicated to celebrate the non-heteronormative diverse Indigenous gender & sexuality in Hinduism. In 2005, the Head Cleric of the Akal Takht condemned same-sex marriages. Hinduism is diverse, with no supreme governing body which allows people of diverse SOGIESC communities to marry under Hindu Marriage Law 1951.

Scientologist opposition 

Scientology founder L. Ron Hubbard classified homosexuality as a mental illness and paraphilia (then known as "sexual perversion"), citing contemporary psychiatric and psychological textbooks to support his view. Gay people are designated a 1.1. on Hubbard's emotional tone scale, and Hubbard urged society to tackle the issue of "sexual perversion" (including homosexuality), calling it "of vital importance, if one wishes to stop immorality, and the abuse of children." In Science of Survival, he called for drastic action to be taken, saying that: "Such people should be taken from the society as rapidly as possible and uniformly institutionalized; for here is the level of the contagion of immorality, and the destruction of ethics; here is the fodder which secret police organizations use for their filthy operations."

A 2004 article in the St. Petersburg Times reported that the Church defines marriage as the union between a man and a woman. The following year, in response to a query about the Church's position on homosexuality, the Church of Scientology stated: "The Church of Scientology does not dictate sexual preferences."

Health 

A 2009 systematic review of research in the UK indicated that there appeared to be limited evidence available from which to draw general conclusions about lesbian, gay, bisexual and transgender health because epidemiological studies had not incorporated sexuality as a factor in data collection. The review found that from the research there is in the UK, there are no differences in terms of major health problems between LGBT people and the general population, although LGBT people's general health appears poorer, but with no specific information on common and major diseases, cancers or long-term health. Research points to issues encountered from an early age, such as LGBT people being targeted for bullying, assault, and discrimination, as contributing significantly to depression, suicide and other mental health issues in adulthood. One researcher looked at the long-term consequences of bullying at schools, and a social researcher has focused on the way LGBT people can experience discriminatory practices in accessing healthcare, and its effects.

Some LGBT activists argue that the experience of growing up LGBT contributes to mental health issues in adulthood, and the barriers to accessing appropriate healthcare as adults contribute towards poorer health; they argue that protection of LGBT rights is necessary to minimise the potential development of health problems and ensure access to healthcare resources. In 2009 Canadian LGBT activists filed a complaint alleging that the health issues of LGBT Canadians are being neglected by the government, equating it to a violation of the human rights of LGBT people. In the complaint, the activists highlight a life expectancy 20 years less than average for LGBT people, with more cases of cancer and HIV and increased rates of suicide, alcoholism and drug use.

Opposition in different countries

Belarus 

A 2014 report prepared by the United Kingdom, under the Conservative and Liberal Democrat coalition government of 2010–2015, raised concerns about LGBT treatment in Belarus:

Malaysia 
In 2018, Malaysian LGBTs were facing government-enforced clampdowns.

India 

On October 6, 1860, sodomy was legally forbidden in India according to Section 377 of the Indian Penal Code. This was ruled unconstitutional in 2009 by the Delhi High Court, but reaffirmed on 11 December 2013 by a Supreme Court ruling.
It was again legalised by the Supreme Court on 6 September 2018.

Poland 

Opposition to LGBT rights in Poland comes mainly from right-wing politics, such as the ruling Law and Justice party, and from the Catholic Church in Poland, in which a majority of Poles are members. According to ILGA-Europe's 2020 report, Poland ranks the lowest of European Union countries for LGBT rights. According to some opinion polls, opposition to LGBT rights has been diminishing, with support for civil partnerships rising from 52% in 2017 to 60% in 2019. The number of Poles who say that homosexuality should not be accepted in society dropped from 41% in 2001 to 24% in 2019.

Russia 

Opposition to the LGBT rights movement is very prevalent in Russia, including within the Kremlin. President Vladimir Putin enacted laws in 2012 which criminalised education about LGBT issues, calling it "gay propaganda". It banned telling minors that homosexuality was normal or natural. This was opposed by some nations with many members of the public in the U.S. and Western Europe calling for a boycott of the 2014 Winter Olympics in Sochi. However, President Putin assured that all athletes would be respected, regardless of their sexuality and in the event, no boycott occurred.

The law passed has been described as taking Russia's LGBT community "from being a stigmatized fringe group to full-blown enemies of the state", and has been described as a major contributor to a wave of anti-gay violence by several neo-Nazi organisations (such as Occupy Paedophilia), which target gay teens online and meet up with them, posting on YouTube their acts of assault against the LGBT teens, which have even resulted in the death of several LGBT teens in Russia, which are rarely investigated by the authorities, defining them as "civil movements fighting the sins of society".

United Kingdom 

In 1988, the Conservative Party, who were in government at the time, enacted Section 28 which stated that local authorities must not "intentionally promote homosexuality or publish material with the intention of promoting homosexuality"  and that maintained schools should not "promote the teaching [...] of the acceptability of homosexuality", describing families with gay parents as being in a "pretended family relationship". Research on the effect of suppressing information about sexuality awareness in schools showed a correspondence with increases in the level of homophobic bullying by peers, as well as increased incidence in depression and suicide amongst LGBT people trying to come to terms with their sexuality. In 1987, Thatcher also declared that "hard left education authorities and extremist teachers" were indoctrinating the nation by teaching the younger generation "political slogans", "anti-racist mathematics" and telling their pupils that they have an "inalienable right to be gay", rather than "taught to respect traditional moral values". She then went on to say that "all of those children are being cheated of a sound start in life—yes cheated!"

In 2003, despite opposition from socially liberal Conservatives such as later prime minister David Cameron, Section 28 was repealed by the Labour government under Tony Blair.

In June 2009, Cameron, whilst campaigning for the 2010 general election, formally apologised for his party introducing the law, stating that it was a mistake and had been offensive to gay people.

In 2013, same-sex marriage was legalised under Cameron's premiership, which Cameron described as "an important step forward" and said that he thought that "it is right that gay people should be able to get married too".

As of 2010, the largest voice against LGBT equality in the UK came from the Church of England over the issue of same-sex marriage. Labour passed into law in 2005 the ability for same-sex couples to enter civil partnerships, but they could not take place in a church or be called a "marriage". The Church of England opposed the-then coalition Government's plans (this government came to an end in May 2015) to extend this to "full marriage rights."

The British National Party has shifted its platform from recriminalisation to an extension of section 28-style legislation, i.e. making it illegal to portray homosexuality positively in the media.  In 1999, the Admiral Duncan pub, a gay bar in London's Soho, was targeted up as part of a terrorist campaign by a former National Socialist Movement and British National Party (BNP) member, David Copeland; three people were killed, and seventy maimed or injured by a nail bomb detonated in the pub.

United States

History 

In the 1950s in the United States, open homosexuality was taboo. Legislatures in every state had passed laws against homosexual behavior well before this, most notably anti-sodomy laws. During the Cold War politicians frequently described homosexuals as "subversives" who undermined national security and patriotism, and described them as Communist sympathisers or a Communist Fifth column. During the Lavender Scare, Joseph McCarthy used accusations of homosexuality as a smear tactic. Senator Kenneth Wherry publicized fears that Joseph Stalin had obtained a list of closeted homosexuals in positions of power from Adolf Hitler, which he believed Stalin intended to use to blackmail these men into working against the U.S. for the Soviet regime. In the 1950 report produced by a Senate subcommittee titled "Employment of Homosexuals and Other Sex Perverts in Government" said that "the pervert is easy prey to the blackmailer... It is an accepted fact among intelligence agencies that espionage organizations the world over consider sex perverts who are in possession of or have access to confidential material to be prime targets where pressure can be exerted." Along with that security-based concern, the report found homosexuals unsuitable for government employment because "those who engage in overt acts of perversion lack the emotional stability of normal persons. In addition, there is an abundance of evidence to sustain the conclusion that indulgence in acts of sex perversion weakens the moral fiber of an individual to a degree that he is not suitable for a position of responsibility." McCarthy and Roy Cohn more often used the secrets of closeted gay American politicians as tools for blackmail than did foreign powers.

The modern roots of the Christian right's views on sexual matters were evident in the years 1950s–1960s, a period in which many conservative Christians in the United States viewed sexual promiscuity as not only excessive, but in fact as a threat to their ideal vision of the country. Beginning in the 1970s, conservative Christian protests against promiscuity began to surface, largely as a reaction to the "permissive Sixties" and an emerging prominence of sexual rights arising from Roe v. Wade and the LGBT rights movement. The Christian right proceeded to make sexuality issues a priority political cause. Anita Bryant organized Save Our Children, a widespread campaign to oppose legislation prohibiting discrimination on the basis of sexual orientation in Miami-Dade County, Florida. The group argued that gay people were "recruiting" or "molesting children" in order to make them gay. Bryant infamously claimed that "As a mother, I know that homosexuals cannot biologically reproduce children; therefore, they must recruit our children," and also claimed that "If gays are granted rights, next we'll have to give rights to prostitutes and to people who sleep with St. Bernards and to nail biters." The Bryant campaign achieved success in repealing some city anti-discrimination laws, and proposed other citizen initiatives such as a failed California ballot question designed to ban gay people or those who supported LGBT rights from holding public teaching jobs. Bryant's campaign attracted widespread opposition and boycotts which put her out of business and destroyed her reputation.

From the late 1970s onwards, some conservative Christian organizations such as the Christian Broadcasting Network, Focus on the Family, Concerned Women for America, the American Family Association, and the Christian Coalition of America, along with right-wing Christian hate groups such as the Westboro Baptist Church, have been outspoken against LGBT rights. Late in 1979, a new religious revival among conservative Evangelical Protestants and Roman Catholics ushered in the Republican coalition politically aligned with the Christian right that would reign in the United States between the years 1970s and 1980s, becoming another obstacle for the progress of the LGBTQ rights movement. During the HIV/AIDS epidemic of the 1980s, LGBTQ communities were further stigmatized as they became the focus of mass hysteria, suffered isolation and marginalization, and were targeted with extreme acts of violence.

The Christian right champions itself as the "self-appointed conscience of American society". During the 1980s, the movement was largely dismissed by political pundits and mainstream religious leaders as "a collection of buffoonish has-beens". Later, it re-emerged, better organized and more focused, taking firm positions against abortion, pornography, sexual deviancy, and extreme feminism. Beginning around the presidency of Donald Trump, Christian conservatives have largely refrained from engaging in debates about sexual morality.

Influential Christian right organizations at the forefront of the anti-gay rights movement in the United States include Focus on the Family, Family Research Council, and the Family Research Institute. An important stratagem in Christian right anti-gay politics is in its rejection of "the edicts of a Big Brother" state, allowing it to profit from "a general feeling of discontent and demoralization with government". As a result, the Christian right has endorsed smaller government, restricting its ability to arbitrate in disputes regarding values and traditions. In this context, gay rights laws have come to symbolize the government's allegedly unconstitutional "[interference] with individual freedom".

The central tenets of Focus on the Family and similar organizations, such as the Family Research Council, emphasise issues such as abortion and the necessity of gender roles. A number of organizations, including the New Christian Right, "have in various ways rejected liberal America in favor of the regulation of pornography, anti-abortion legislation, the criminalization of homosexuality, and the virtues of faithfulness and loyalty in sexual partnerships", according to sociologist Bryan Turner.

U.S. public opinion 

Public opinion has shifted towards increased acceptance of homosexuality and equal rights for gays and lesbians since the late 1970s. According to the Gallup poll, the percentage of Americans who think that same-sex relations between consenting adults should be legal increased from 43% in 1977 to 59% in 2007. In 1977, 56% of Americans thought that gay people should have equal rights in terms of job opportunities. , that number has risen to 89%. In 1982, 34% thought that homosexuality should be considered "an acceptable alternative lifestyle". , that number is 54%. In 1997, 27% of Americans thought that same-sex marriages should be legally valid. That number is 46% . A poll conducted in 2013 showed a record high of 58% of the Americans supporting legal recognition for same-sex marriage. In April 2015, a Washington Post-ABC News poll showed that 61% of Americans supported same-sex marriage and a similar share were against state-by-state legalization.

Numerous studies have investigated the prevalence of acceptance and disapproval of homosexuality and have consistently found correlations with various demographic, psychological, and social variables. For example, studies (mainly conducted in the United States) have found that heterosexuals with positive attitudes towards homosexuality are more likely to be non-religious, politically liberal or moderate, young, female and have close personal contact with openly gay men and lesbians. They are also more likely to have positive attitudes towards other minority groups and are less likely to support traditional gender roles.

United States Armed Forces 

Homosexual activity was a reason for expulsion from the United States Armed Forces from their very beginning, although that was not codified until 1920. The "Don't ask, don't tell" (DADT) policy that began in 1994 barred the military from questioning people about their sexual orientation, but maintained the barring of service members who had come out. The barring of homosexuals was removed altogether in December 2010 by President Barack Obama.

Even before DADT was established, advocates for allowing gay people to openly serve pointed out that neither unit cohesion nor morale were affected when the UK admitted gay people into the military. A similar comparison has been made to the lack of negative consequences when African-Americans and women were admitted into the military.

Boy Scouts of America 

 

The Boy Scouts of America excludes gay and bisexual people from its organizations, an exclusion enforced commonly for Scoutmasters, but also for scouts in leadership positions. Their rationale is that homosexuality is immoral and that Scouts are expected to have certain moral standards and values, as the Scout Oath and Scout Law requires boys to be "morally straight". The Boy Scout organization does not view their policy as unjustly discriminatory, but instead defends their policy saying that, "Tolerance for diversity of values does not require abdication of one's own values".

In 2000 the United States Supreme Court ruled in Boy Scouts of America v. Dale that the Boy Scouts of America is a private organization, and as such can decide its own membership rules. There is still a movement to try to persuade the organization to change its policy or allow local chapters to decide for themselves.

In 2005, the U.S. Congress passed the Support Our Scouts Act of 2005 to exempt the BSA from anti-discrimination laws, to require the Department of Defense to support scouting Jamborees (thus rendering ineffective a Federal Court injunction prohibiting this as an unconstitutional establishment of religion in violation of the First Amendment) and to require state or local governments that receive Community Development Block Grant money from the Department of Housing and Urban Development to allow BSA to have meetings in their facilities or on their property.

The BSA receives much of its funding and support from religious groups noted for their opposition to the gay rights movement. Some BSA local councils found that United Way's, municipalities', school districts' and businesses' support and funding was reduced because of their adherence to the BSA's policy on sexual orientation. In order to continue receiving funding, local councils like New Jersey signed nondiscrimination agreements contrary to BSA National Council policy. Other outdoor-focused, youth-based organizations such as the 4-H club and Girl Scouts of the USA do not discriminate on the basis of sexual orientation.

In most countries where Boy Scouts organizations exist homosexuality is not regarded as incompatible with scout values, and gay members are not excluded from activities; this includes the United Kingdom, where scouting was founded by Baden-Powell.

In July 2015, the Boy Scouts' executive board voted to end the ban on adult leaders who are openly gay.

See also

 Anti-LGBT rhetoric
 Antifeminism
 Anti-gender movement
 Biphobia
 Conversion therapy
 Culture war
 "Down-low", sexual subculture of Black men who identify as heterosexual but secretly have sex with other men
 "Drop the T", slogan coined to encourage LGBT organizations to stop support of transgender people
 Gay agenda
 Gay concentration camps in Chechnya
 Gay–straight alliance
 George Rekers
 Hate crimes against LGBT persons in Russia
 Heteronormativity
 Heterosexism
 Homophile movement
 Homophobic propaganda
 Homosexual recruitment, a conspiracy theory alleging conversion efforts targeting heterosexuals
 Ivar Lovaas
 Lesbophobia
 LGBT in Islam
 LGBT retirement issues
 List of organizations designated by the Southern Poverty Law Center as anti-LGBT hate groups
 List of U.S. ballot initiatives to repeal LGBT anti-discrimination laws
 Persecution of gay and bisexual men by the Islamic State
 Straight pride
 Straightwashing
 Transphobia
 Discrimination against transgender men
 Transmisandry
 Transmisogynoir
 Transphobic misogyny
 Karl Heinrich Ulrichs
 Violence against LGBT people

Notes

References 

Anti-LGBT sentiment
Biphobia
Discrimination against LGBT people
Homophobia
Lesbophobia
Opposition
LGBT and religion
Opposition to same-sex marriage
Persecution of LGBT people
Transphobia